Dysgonomonas hofstadii  is a Gram-negative and facultatively anaerobic bacterium from the genus of Dysgonomonas, which has been isolated from a post-operative abdominal wound.

References

External links
Type strain of Dysgonomonas hofstadii at BacDive -  the Bacterial Diversity Metadatabase

Further reading 
 

Bacteroidia
Bacteria described in 2010